The mixed doubles in table tennis at the 2019 European Games in Minsk is the first edition of the event in a European Games. It was held at Tennis Olympic Centre from 23 June to 25 June 2019.

Schedule
All times are FET (UTC+03:00)

Seeds
The seeding lists were announced on 9 June 2019.

Results

References

External links
Results

Mixed doubles